Mark Durkan (born 26 June 1960) is a retired Irish nationalist politician from Northern Ireland. Durkan was the deputy First Minister of Northern Ireland from November 2001 to October 2002, and the Leader of the Social Democratic and Labour Party (SDLP) from 2001 to 2010. He contested the Dublin constituency for Fine Gael at the 2019 European Parliament election.

Early life
John Mark Durkan was born in Derry, County Londonderry; his father, Brendan, was a Royal Ulster Constabulary District Inspector in Armagh. He was raised by his mother, Isobel, after his father was killed in a road accident in 1961. He was educated at St. Patrick's Primary School and at St. Columb's College, where he was Head Boy.

He studied politics at the Queen's University of Belfast (QUB), and later did a part-time postgraduate course in Public Policy Management with the University of Ulster at Magee. While at QUB Durkan served as Deputy President of Queen's Students' Union from 1982 to 1983. He was also elected Deputy President of the Union of Students in Ireland from 1982 to 1984.

Political career
He became involved in politics in 1981 when he became a member of the Social Democratic and Labour Party. In 1984 he went to work for John Hume as his Westminster Assistant. He became a key figure in organising by-election campaigns for Seamus Mallon and Eddie McGrady in the 1980s.

In 1990 Durkan became chairperson of the SDLP, a position he served in until 1995. He was a key member of the party's negotiating team in the run up to the Good Friday Agreement. Following the Agreement he was elected to the Northern Ireland Assembly in 1998, and became a member of the Northern Ireland Executive as Minister for Finance and Personnel. He served in that position until 2001 when he replaced Seamus Mallon as deputy First Minister. He was also elected Leader of the SDLP the same year.

Durkan was re-elected to the Assembly in the election of November 2003. However, the Assembly and the Executive remained suspended. In the 2005 general election he retained the Foyle seat at Westminster for the SDLP, succeeding John Hume. While down on Hume's vote, Durkan won with a comfortable majority, despite a strong effort by Sinn Féin to take the seat. He garnered 21,119 votes, 46.3% of the total.

Durkan announced his intention to stand down as leader of the SDLP in September 2009 so he could concentrate on his parliamentary career. He was replaced as leader by Margaret Ritchie in February 2010. He is a Fellow of the British-American Project. 

Durkan has publicly supported gay rights by supporting the Foyle Pride Festival in Derry, in solidarity with those who suffer homophobic prejudice and in some cases violent hate attacks.

In 2011, he voted against the military intervention in Libya.

He joined Fine Gael in March 2019 to contest the 2019 European Parliament election for the Dublin constituency but failed to gain a seat. He has now retired from frontline politics, but remains an active member and supporter of the SDLP.

Family
He and his wife Jackie have one child, Dearbháil. His nephew Mark H. Durkan is an SDLP MLA for Foyle.

References

External links

thederryvoice.com – Mark Durkan Election 2010 Website
Mark Durkan's profile at the official SDLP website
Guardian Unlimited Politics – Ask Aristotle: Mark Durkan MP
Mark Durkan's Biography at the Northern Ireland Assembly
Maiden Speech: House of Commons – 30 June 2005
Appearances on C-SPAN

1960 births
Living people
Alumni of Queen's University Belfast
Alumni of Ulster University
Members of the Parliament of the United Kingdom for County Londonderry constituencies (since 1922)
UK MPs 2005–2010
UK MPs 2010–2015
Leaders of the Social Democratic and Labour Party
Members of the Northern Ireland Forum
Northern Ireland MLAs 1998–2003
Northern Ireland MLAs 2003–2007
Northern Ireland MLAs 2007–2011
Ministers of the Northern Ireland Executive (since 1999)
Social Democratic and Labour Party MPs (UK)
People educated at St Columb's College
Politicians from Derry (city)
UK MPs 2015–2017
Ministers of Finance and Personnel of Northern Ireland
Social Democratic and Labour Party MLAs